Jack Lawrence may refer to:
Jack Lawrence (songwriter) (1912–2009), American songwriter
Jack Lawrence (artist) (born 1975), British comic book artist and animator
Jack Lawrence (bluegrass) (born 1953), American bluegrass guitarist
Jack Lawrence (footballer) (born 1934), Australian rules footballer
Jack Lawrence (bass guitarist) (born 1976), American bass guitarist
Jack Lawrence (cricketer) (1904–1984), Irish cricketer
Jack Lawrence (rugby league) (1897–?), Australian rugby player

See also 
John Lawrence (disambiguation)